Sadistic Dance is Hangry & Angry's first full-length album, released approximately one year after the mini-album Kill Me Kiss Me. It was released on November 18, 2009 in both limited and regular editions. The limited edition comes with a bonus DVD and a lunchbox.

The CD also features a bonus track remix of "The Peace!", a Morning Musume song which both members originally recorded as members that group.

Track listing

CD 
 Mr. Monkey
 Top Secret
 Sadistic Dance
 Lady Madonna
 Doubt
 Angelia (crash berlin version)
 Shake Me
 Kill Me Kiss Me (crash berlin version)
 GIZA GIZA (crash berlin version)

Bonus Track
The☆Peace! (H&A Death Tracks)

Limited edition DVD 
 Top Secret
 Kill Me Kiss Me

References 

2009 albums
Hangry & Angry albums
Zetima albums